"I'm a Train" is a song written by Albert Hammond and Mike Hazlewood and performed by Hammond. It was first recorded in French, in 1967, by Les Troubadours as "La chaîne". The first English version was recorded in 1968 by a UK group called Colors of Love, which included singer Elaine Paige.

Albert Hammond recording
Hammond's own version, released in 1974, was the first one to chart. The song reached #15 on the Adult Contemporary chart and #31 on the Billboard Hot 100 in 1974. It also made number 2 in the then West Germany, where it stayed in the Top 20 for 14 weeks. It also reached the Top 3 in Switzerland, the Top 10 in the Netherlands, Norway and the Flemish part of Belgium, and reached number 22 in the French-speaking part of Belgium. The song appeared on Hammond's 1974 album, Albert Hammond. The song was produced by him and Roy Halee and also was featured, along with filmed footage of trains traveling, on Captain Kangaroo.

Charts

References

1974 songs
1974 singles
Songs written by Albert Hammond
Songs written by Mike Hazlewood
Albert Hammond songs
Elaine Paige songs
Columbia Records singles